Tiger Bay is the third studio album by English indie dance band Saint Etienne. It was released  by Heavenly Records. In an interview with Record Collector, band member Bob Stanley stated that the title is a reference to the 1959 film Tiger Bay.

The album is described by Bob Stanley as "an album of modern folk songs done in twentieth century styles like techno and dub". "Like a Motorway", for example, blends Kraftwerk-style techno with the melody from the nineteenth century folk song "Silver Dagger". Some of the songs, such as "Marble Lions" and "Former Lover" forsake electronics for classical folk instrumentation and orchestral arrangements. One, "Western Wind", is a traditional English folk song.

Composition
The band wrote most of the songs in the Forest of Dean, in the hope that the countryside would inspire folk ideas. The original intention was for all the songs to be about death.

Releases
Tiger Bay was released in the UK in June 1994. The original cover art is James Clarke Hook's "Welcome Bonny Boat", doctored to include the band members.

The American edition of the album replaced the UK cover art with a photograph of the band smartly dressed at a table. It does not include the "Western Wind"/"Tankerville" suite. In place of the cut songs is the single "I Was Born On Christmas Day" and remixes by Daniel Abraham of "Hug My Soul" and "Like a Motorway".

Tiger Bay was reissued in 1996 by Creation Records, in part because of Saint Etienne's absence from the music scene, but also because of their formal move to Creation Records. The reissue featured another new cover, this time showing Giuditta del Vecchio (from the film Léolo); the back shows a picture of the group. The inner sleeve was updated, and includes a short commentary on the album by journalist and friend of the group Simon Price, as well as a new selection of photographs with a summery theme. The album itself features a slightly shuffled track listing. "Marble Lions" is moved to appear after "Pale Movie". The second occurrence of "Western Wind" is removed completely; instead "Tankerville" fades into "Boy Scouts of America". "Former Lover" is also edited, although less noticeably, with only the opening guitar chords being removed. The reissue also features four extra tracks – "I Buy American Records", "Grovely Road", "Hate your Drug" and the single edit of "He's on the Phone".

In 2010 the album was re-released once more. The new deluxe version reinstates the original sleeve art and includes a booklet with an interview with Bob Stanley and additional bonus disc containing a number of demos and all of the b-sides.

Response

The British release of Tiger Bay was commercially successful and reached #8 on the UK Album Chart. Three singles were released, but none matched the popularity of those from their previous album. The first, "Pale Movie", peaked at No. 28. "Like a Motorway" was more disappointing, missing the top forty completely and making only No. 47. "Hug My Soul" was released as a two-disc set and managed better, peaking at No. 32.

A reviewer for Music & Media praised Tiger Bay and said "Pale Movie" was "a hit in the waiting room". 

"Hug My Soul" was the only single that charted in the US and reached No. 40 on the Billboard Hot Dance Club Play chart.

In a 2009 interview, Bob Stanley said that in retrospect the band should have included some more obvious singles on Tiger Bay, to be commercial: "it definitely could have done with a couple more obvious songs". He also acknowledged that the original cover was a commercial mistake.

Track listing

2010 deluxe edition

Personnel

Original credits (1994)

 Saint Etienne - producer
 Ian Catt - engineer
 Recorded at Cat Music, summer - autumn 1993

Saint Etienne
 Sarah Cracknell – vocals, snowboard, scaremonger
 Bob Stanley – keyboards, wulfren, Scouse wit
 Pete Wiggs – keyboards, space blue rinse, saucy git
 Ian Catt – keyboards, guitar, bass guitar, bodlondeb

Additional personnel
 Rick Smith - mixing, programming (at Lemon World) ("Urban Clearway", "Like a Motorway", "Cool Kids of Death")
 Mark 'Spike' Stent - mixing (for SSO Productions) ("Hug My Soul", "Pale Movie")
 'Jim Bob' Wheatley - engineer ("Hug My Soul", "Pale Movie")
 Original Rockers - rhythms, bass and mixes ("On the Shore", "Western Wind", "Tankerville")
 David Whitaker – orchestral arrangements
 Shara Nelson – vocals ("On the Shore")
 Stephen Duffy – guest vocals ("Western Wind")
 Debsey – backing vocals ("Former Lover", "Pale Movie")
 Siobhan Brookes – backing vocals ("Hug My Soul", "Pale Movie")
 Mick Bund – guitar ("Marble Lions")
 Ian Davies – flamenco guitar ("Pale Movie")
 Mike Patton – guitar ("Former Lover"), mandolin ("On the Shore")
 Kate St John – oboe ("On the Shore")
 Spencer Smith – drums ("Hug My Soul")

Design
 Anthony Sweeney - design
 Peter Mennim - cover painting (after Welcome Bonny Boat by James Clarke Hook)
 Paul Kelly - photos
 Aude Prieur - photos
 Francesca Simon - archive research
 Mr Stripey - in memory of

Alternate credits for American release
 Tim Burgess - guest vocals ("I Was Born On Christmas Day")
 'Jim Bob' Wheatley - engineer ("I Was Born On Christmas Day")
 Mark 'Spike' Stent - mixing ("I Was Born On Christmas Day")
 Daniel Abraham - additional production and mix (for White Falcon Productions), additional programming ("Hug My Soul (Alternate Version)", "Like a Motorway (Alternate Version)")
 Merve Depeyer - keyboards, programming ("Hug My Soul (Alternate Version)", "Like a Motorway (Alternate Version)")
 Juan Garcia - overdub engineering ("Hug My Soul (Alternate Version)", "Like a Motorway (Alternate Version)")
 Recorded at Scream Studios, NYC, mixed at Right Track Recording, NYC. ("Hug My Soul (Alternate Version)", "Like a Motorway (Alternate Version)")

Additional credits for 1996 British re-release

 Recorded summer 1995 ("Grovely Road")
 Recorded at Olympic, summer 1995 ("He's on the Phone")
 'Jim Bob' Wheatley - engineer ("He's on the Phone")
 Motiv 8 - mix arranged by ("He's on the Phone")
 Etienne Daho appears courtesy of Virgin France ("He's on the Phone")

Design
 Stylorouge - designed at
 Cover photograph from the film Leolo, courtesy of Metro Tartan
 Paul Kelly - band photograph
 Rob O'Connor - inside photographs
 Mr John O'Connor Senior - inside photographs
 Simon Price - liner notes

B-sides
From "Pale Movie"
 "Highgate Road Incident"
 "Pale Movie (Stentorian Dub)"
 "Pale Movie (Secret Knowledge Trouser Assassin Mix)"
 "Pale Movie (Lemonentry Mix)" (Remixed by Rick Smith from Underworld)

From "Like a Motorway"
 "You Know I'll Miss You When You're Gone"
 "Sushi Rider"
 "Like a Motorway (Chekhov Warp Dub)" (Remixed by The Chemical Brothers)
 "Like A Motorway (The David Holmes Mix)"
 "Like A Motorway (Skin Up You're Already Dead Mix)" (Remixed by Autechre)

From "Hug My Soul"
 "I Buy American Records"
 "Hate Your Drug"
 "La Poupee Qui Fait Non (No, No, No, No, No)"
 "Hug My Soul (Twelve Inch Mix)"
 "Hug My Soul (Motiv 8 Blackpool Mix)"
 "Hug My Soul (Sure Is Pure Kodacolour House Mix)"
 "Hug My Soul (Juan Kinky Hernandez Nu Bootz Groove)"
 "Hug My Soul (Secret Knowledge Limbo Mix)"

Charts

References

External links
 Lyrics and fan reviews

1994 albums
Saint Etienne (band) albums
Heavenly Recordings albums